KK Crvena zvezda is a men's professional basketball club based in Belgrade, Serbia, which has youth system teams, cadets (under-16) and juniors (under-18 and under-19). The U18 and U19 teams play in the RODA Junior Basketball League of Serbia and the Junior Adriatic League. They have won a Euroleague Basketball Next Generation Tournament. The U16 team plays in the Triglav Cadet Basketball League of Serbia.

Some of the most notable home-grown players of Crvena zvezda are Zoran Slavnić, a member of the 50 greatest players in the history of FIBA international basketball, as selected in 1991, then Igor Rakočević – the three-time EuroLeague Top Scorer, Peja Stojaković – the NBA All-Star player and FIBA EuroBasket MVP, as well as Vladimir Cvetković and Dragan Kapičić.

Further notable home-grown players include Goran Rakočević, Ivan Sarjanović, Žarko Koprivica, Slobodan Nikolić, Predrag Bogosavljev, Boban Janković, Mirko Milićević, Branislav Prelević, Aleksandar Trifunović, Nebojša Ilić, Saša Obradović, Rastko Cvetković, Nikola Jestratijević, Miloš Vujanić, Vladimir Radmanović, Milutin Aleksić, Milko Bjelica, Luka Bogdanović, Tadija Dragićević, Nemanja Nedović, Marko Gudurić, and Ognjen Dobrić.

Aleksandar Đorđević (one of 50 Greatest EuroLeague Contributors), Dejan Koturović, Marko Jarić and Vladimir Micov were members of the club's youth system who have never appeared in a regular season or playoff game for the first team.

History 
In 2014, Crvena zvezda captured its first Euroleague Basketball Nike International Junior Tournament title by beating Real Madrid 55–42 in the final Sunday at Mediolanim Forum in Milan. The team was coached by Stevan Mijović and featured Stefan Kenić, Jovan Anđelković, Danilo Ostojić, Vojislav Stojanović, Nikola Rakićević, Bratislav Jerković, Aleksa Radanov, David Miladinović, Marko Radovanović, Boriša Simanić, Aleksandar Aranitović, Stefan Lazarević.

In the 2014–15 Euroleague NGT season Finals, Crvena zvezda got defeated Real Madrid with 70–73. The team was coached by Slobodan Klipa and featured Ivan Ćorović, Nemanja Kapetanović, Aleksandar Aranitović, Vojislav Stojanović, Aleksa Radanov, Stefan Kenić, Jovan Drljača, David Miladinović, Nikola Popović, Boriša Simanić, Nikola Rakićević, and Matija Radović.

In the 2015–16 Euroleague NGT season Finals, Crvena zvezda got defeated FC Barcelona Lassa with 82–90. The team was coached by Branko Maksimović and featured Petar Rebić, Aleksa Uskoković, Ivan Ćorović, Milan Radaković, Uroš Ilić, Stefan Momirov, Srećko Gašić, Boriša Simanić, Aleksa Radanov, Matija Radović, Stefan Đorđević and Vladimir Kovačević. Boriša Simanić won the MVP Finals Award.

The U19 team joined the 3rd-tier First Regional League – Center for the 2021–22 season.

Players

Current U19 roster

Current U16 roster

Staff

Current members

Notable coaches

  Milan Bjegojević
  Mile Protić
  Božidar Maljković
  Vladislav Lučić
  Marin Sedlaček
  Stevan Karadžić
  Darko Rajaković
  Slobodan Klipa

Youth system coordinators 
  Marin Sedlaček (2003–2007)
  Slobodan Klipa (2016–2022)
  Jovica Antonić (2022–present)

Season-by-season
The U19 roster competed in the senior league system:

Trophies and awards

Trophies 
 Euroleague NGT
 Winners (1): 2013–14
 Runners-up (2): 2014–15, 2015–16

 Junior ABA League
 Runners-up (2): 2017–18, 2018–19

Junior Basketball League of Serbia
 Winners (6): 2007–08, 2013–14, 2014–15, 2016–17, 2017–18, 2018–19
 Runners-up (2): 2012–13, 2015–16

Cadets Basketball League of Serbia
 Winners (5): 2013, 2014, 2015, 2016–17, 2017–18
 Runners-up (3): 2015–16, 2018–19, 2020–21

 Pioneer Basketball league of Serbia
 Winners (5): 2003, 2012, 2013, 2015, 2018
 Pioneer Serbian Cup
 Winners (2): 2019, 2020

Junior Basketball League of Yugoslavia (defunct)
 Winners (9): 1948, 1949, 1952, 1953, 1957, 1963, 1967, 1978, 1984
 Runners-up (3): 1977

Cadets Basketball League of Yugoslavia (defunct)
 Winners (4): 1973, 1974, 1975, 1985

Awards 
 Euroleague NGT Finals MVP (2)
  Vojislav Stojanović – 2014
  Boriša Simanić – 2016
 Junior Basketball League of Serbia Finals MVP
  Bojan Tomašević – 2019

References

External links
 KK Crvena zvezda official website 
 Club info at Junior Adriatic League
 Club info at eurobasket.com
 Club info at ANGT
 Club info at realGM.com

Youth
Basketball teams in Belgrade